is a Japanese professional golfer who plays on the Japan Golf Tour.

Ichihara had his first win on the tour in June 2018, the Japan Golf Tour Championship Mori Building Cup Shishido Hills. Previously his best finish is T-2 at the 2016 Gateway to The Open Mizuno Open. He also has one win on the Japan Challenge Tour, the 2003 Kanitop Cup.

Ichihara qualified for the 2012 Open Championship through International Final Qualifying, but missed the cut. His runner-up finish at the 2016 Mizuno Open qualified him for the 2016 Open Championship. He made the cut and finished tied for 79th. Ichihara's win at the 2018 Japan Golf Tour Championship lifted him to second place in the 2018 Japan Golf Tour money list, earning him a place in the 2018 Open Championship.

Professional wins (3)

Japan Golf Tour wins (2)

Japan Challenge Tour wins (1)

Results in major championships

CUT = missed the half-way cut
"T" = tied

Results in World Golf Championships

"T" = Tied

Team appearances
Professional
Amata Friendship Cup (representing Japan): 2018

References

External links

Japanese male golfers
Japan Golf Tour golfers
1982 births
Living people